The year 1971 in archaeology involved some significant events.

Explorations
 The Historic American Engineering Record surveys the original main line of the New York and Erie Rail Road; the Cooper Union foundation building in Manhattan; and sites in Utah and Pennsylvania.

Excavations

The Chaco Project, conducted by the National Park Service and the University of New Mexico, surveys and excavates Chaco Canyon (until 1982)
The excavations at Buccino: Two Universities (Wesleyan & Tufts) conducted an excavation and survey program around the town of Buccino to determine the settlement patterns during the Roman period. During the 1971 season three sites were excavated. They ran a series of experiments using the Barringer proton magnetometer which is designed to test the feasibility of its use in the Buccino area. They excavated three sites: the Villa at Vagni, Villa at Pareti, and the Villa at San Nicola. The site at Vagni lies on an artificial terraced platform overlooking the Cosenza-Potenza road and the Platona-Tanagro valley. Within the Villa of Vagni they found pottery which included black gaze. From Vagni it was found that the countryside around Buccino was used till the last years of the fourth century. The Villa at Pareti showed much pottery from the Lucanian which may have suggested that it was Lucanian as well. There was a major problem at the Villa at Pareti which was to features with the polygonal platform walls. The Villa at San Nicola is located below the town of Buccino and across the river from the other two sites.
Scientific excavations at Anshan in Iran begin.

Publications

 Leakey, M.D., 1971: Olduvai Gorge Volume 3, Excavations in Beds I & II 1960-1963, Cambridge University Press, Cambridge.

Finds
 May 5 - Hull of Tudor navy ship Mary Rose (capsized 1545) rediscovered in the Solent
 July - Guns and other artefacts from HMY Mary (wrecked 1675) discovered independently by members of Chorley and Merseyside Sub-Aqua Clubs
 July 22 - The Lady of Baza Iberian sculpture (4th century BC)
 Remains of Marsala Ship (sank c. 241 BC off Sicily) exposed
 Remains of  discovered off Montauk, New York
 Tomb of King Muryeong (d. 523), ruler of Baekje in the Three Kingdoms of Korea
 Tomb of Xin Zhui (d. 163 BC) at Mawangdui in Changsha, China

Awards

Miscellaneous
 October - Society for Industrial Archeology founded in Washington, D.C.

Births

Deaths
August 22 - Birger Nerman, Swedish archaeologist (b. 1888)
August 24 - Carl Blegen, American Classical archaeologist (b. 1887)

References

Archaeology
Archaeology
Archaeology by year